Jack Redden (born 9 December 1990) is a former Australian rules football player who played for the West Coast Eagles in the Australian Football League (AFL).

Early life
Originally from Keith, South Australia, Redden participated in the Auskick program there. He attended Sacred Heart College and played senior football with Glenelg in the SANFL. His brother Tom Redden was once listed as a rookie at the Adelaide Football Club. 

Redden was selected with the Brisbane Lions' second selection (pick 25 overall) in the 2008 National Draft.

AFL career

2009 
Redden made his senior debut in round 15, 2009 against Geelong, where he kicked one goal. He remained in the Brisbane side for the remainder of the season, including two finals series matches.

2010 
Redden was one of few Brisbane players to have played in all 22 game season for the Brisbane Lions in 2010.

Redden was the third player (after Todd Banfield and Tom Rockliff) from the Brisbane Lions to have earned a NAB Rising Star nomination in 2010, an award which recognises the standout performers of the AFL who are of 21 years of age or younger and played 10 games before the conclusion of the current season.   Redden ended up losing out to Sydney youngster Dan Hannebery.   Redden earned his nomination after what was said to be an "outstanding" performance in a narrow loss against St Kilda.

Alongside his 4 goals, Redden also took 114 marks and had an average of 17 disposals per game.   In his second season, he led Brisbane in tackles (with 115) and was ranked third in the club for inside-50s (with 73).

In the end of year Club Champion Award, Redden ended up with a 5th-placed finish with a grand total of 26.5 votes.

2011 

2011 has been considered Redden's breakout season, playing some of his best football.   Redden's kicked 14 goals in his 22 matches this season.   Redden has also had a career-high 32 disposals v Carlton in round 12 and Hawthorn in round 16, a season-high 9 marks v Sydney in round 11 and Collingwood in round 22 and a career-high 13 tackles v Fremantle in round 1 and Port Adelaide in round 15.   Redden totalled 166 tackles for the season (ranked 5th for the season and having the 3rd highest average), having the most tackles of players not to have played in the finals.   This caused Redden to be ranked 9th on the all-time list of most tackles in a season since statistics for tackles have been counted.

Redden is said to play a crucial role in the current re-building process which the Brisbane Lions team is undertaking.   In this reference, Redden is listed alongside Tom Rockliff, Todd Banfield and Daniel Rich who are considered important to the re-building process.  Teammate Matthew Leuenberger is also another player who is excited by the future of Redden and co.

Redden has not missed a game since his debut in round 15, 2009.

Redden was listed to be Brisbane's most underrated player in a club-by-club analysis of the most underrated players by Fox Sports journalists John Clark and Paul Pickering.   Redden was noted to "rarely earn the plaudits as peers Daniel Rich and Tom Rockliff".

With club legend Simon Black considered to be on the back-end of his career, Redden was also considered to be one of the players which could take over the role.   In an interview after Brisbane's loss to Richmond in round 13, Redden said "it'll be big shoes to fill when Blacky (Simon Black) does leave... but most definitely I would love to take that spot in the team" but yet admits "there's plenty of other boys that have the potential to do that".   In the article, Whiting said Redden has a "hunger for the contested footy" and is a "composed young player with strong hands overhead and a great work ethic".

Redden ranked 3rd in the Brisbane best and fairest awards (otherwise known as the Merrett-Murray Medal) in 2011 with 35 votes, finishing only 2.5 votes behind winner Tom Rockliff and half a vote behind runner-up Simon Black.   Because of his third-place finish, Redden won the Alistair Lynch trophy.   Also, Redden was announced as being the most courageous player for Brisbane in the year, winning him the Shaun Hart Most Courageous Player award.

Redden also polled his first Brownlow Medal vote this year, the award which rewards the AFL's fairest and best player. Redden polled the vote in his 27 disposal, 2 goal and 12 tackle effort v St Kilda in round 5.

2015

2018 
Redden won his first premiership at the Eagles after defeating Collingwood by 5 points. He placed runner up in the John Worsfold Medal count for the Eagles and was also named player of the finals.

2022 
After playing a good season individually for a season that would want to be forgotten for the Eagles, Redden retired from the game after 14 seasons, seven of those being in Eagle colours. He finished his career at the age of 31 playing 263 games.

Statistics
  Statistics are correct to the end of round 5, 2019

|- 
|- style="background-color: #EAEAEA"
! scope="row" style="text-align:center" | 2009
|style="text-align:center;"|
| 30 || 10 || 6 || 4 || 74 || 64 || 138 || 37 || 35 || 0.6 || 0.4 || 7.4 || 6.4 || 13.8 || 3.7 || 3.5
|-
! scope="row" style="text-align:center" | 2010
|style="text-align:center;"|
| 30 || 22 || 4 || 11 || 191 || 194 || 385 || 114 || 115 || 0.2 || 0.5 || 8.7 || 8.8 || 17.5 || 5.2 || 5.2
|- style="background-color: #EAEAEA"
! scope="row" style="text-align:center" | 2011
|style="text-align:center;"|
| 30 || 22 || 14 || 5 || 284 || 242 || 526 || 119 || 166 || 0.6 || 0.2 || 12.9 || 11.0 || 23.9 || 5.4 || 7.5
|-
! scope="row" style="text-align:center" | 2012
|style="text-align:center;"|
| 30 || 22 || 11 || 3 || 263 || 286 || 549 || 108 || 142 || 0.5 || 0.1 || 12.0 || 13.0 || 25.0 || 4.9 || 6.5
|- style="background-color: #EAEAEA"
! scope="row" style="text-align:center" | 2013
|style="text-align:center;"|
| 30 || 22 || 9 || 7 || 246 || 235 || 481 || 89 || 147 || 0.4 || 0.3 || 11.2 || 10.7 || 21.9 || 4.0 || 6.7
|-
! scope="row" style="text-align:center" | 2014
|style="text-align:center;"|
| 30 || 14 || 6 || 4 || 188 || 146 || 334 || 71 || 98 || 0.4 || 0.3 || 13.4 || 10.4 || 23.8 || 5.1 || 7.0
|- style="background-color: #EAEAEA"
! scope="row" style="text-align:center" | 2015
|style="text-align:center;"|
| 30 || 17 || 2 || 1 || 210 || 191 || 401 || 83 || 103 || 0.1 || 0.1 || 12.4 || 11.2 || 23.6 || 4.9 || 6.1
|-
! scope="row" style="text-align:center" | 2016
|style="text-align:center;"|
| 8 || 15 || 5 || 4 || 102 || 139 || 241 || 42 || 72 || 0.3 || 0.3 || 6.8 || 9.3 || 16.1 || 2.8 || 4.8
|- style="background-color: #EAEAEA"
! scope="row" style="text-align:center" | 2017
|style="text-align:center;"|
| 8 || 19 || 4 || 1 || 187 || 202 || 389 || 87 || 98 || 0.2 || 0.1 || 9.8 || 10.6 || 20.5 || 4.6 || 5.2
|-
|style="text-align:center;background:#afe6ba;"|2018†
|style="text-align:center;"|
| 8 || 25 || 10 || 4 || 351 || 277 || 628 || 140 || 118 || 0.4 || 0.2 || 14.0 || 11.1 || 25.1 || 5.6 || 4.7
|- style="background-color: #EAEAEA"
! scope="row" style="text-align:center" | 2019
|style="text-align:center;"|
| 8 || 5 || 0 || 0 || 64 || 50 || 114 || 29 || 15 || 0.0 || 0.0 || 12.8 || 10.0 || 22.8 || 5.8 || 3.0
|- class="sortbottom"
! colspan=3| Career
! 193
! 71
! 44
! 2160
! 2026
! 4186
! 919
! 1109
! 0.4
! 0.2
! 11.2
! 10.5
! 21.7
! 4.8
! 5.7
|}

Notes

External links

1990 births
Living people
Brisbane Lions players
Glenelg Football Club players
Australian rules footballers from South Australia
West Coast Eagles players
West Coast Eagles Premiership players
People from Keith, South Australia
East Perth Football Club players
People educated at Sacred Heart College, Adelaide
One-time VFL/AFL Premiership players